Haw flakes are Chinese sweets made from the fruit of the Chinese hawthorn. The pale/dark pink candy is usually formed into discs two millimeters thick, and packaged in cylindrical stacks with label art resemblant of Chinese fireworks. The sweet and tangy snack is usually served to guests along with tea or as a treat for children. Some Chinese people take the flakes with bitter Chinese herbal medicine.

Variety

Gourmet haw flakes are also available at specialty Chinese markets in the West.  Gourmet haw flakes tend to be larger than the regular Shandong haw flakes (gourmet haw flakes are about 35–40 mm in diameter where as the Shandong haw flakes are about 25 mm in diameter).

Low sugar and additive-free haw flakes aimed towards the health conscious are readily available in China but less so in the West. They will vary from pale beige to reddish brown in color.

Regulation
Haw flakes have been seized on several occasions by the United States Food and Drug Administration for containing Ponceau 4R (E124, Acid Red 18), an unapproved artificial coloring. Ponceau 4R is used in Europe, Asia and Australia but is not approved by the US FDA.

Currently, certain brands of haw flakes contain Allura Red AC (FD& C #40) as the red coloring. In Europe, Allura Red AC is not recommended for consumption by children. The food coloring was previously banned in Denmark, Belgium, France, and Switzerland.

See also
Tanghulu

References

External links
 Cardhouse.com - Package Design 19 (Haw Flakes)
 Description of Haw Flakes

Confectionery
Hong Kong cuisine
Shandong cuisine